, also known as , is a Japanese shōjo anime directed by Makoto Moriwaki. It was adapted from the Sega arcade game of the same name. It was also adapted into two manga series by Mai Jinna.

Plot
Ringo Yukimori was walking with her mom and finds a bookstore selling three fairy tale books, Snow White, Cinderella, and The Tale of Princess Kaguya. Ringo herself finds the books disappearing. The reason why the books are disappearing happens to be is that Fairyland is trouble because the princesses are missing and their respective worlds are disappearing, causing a ripple effect on Earth where their stories are popular. The Queen of Fairyland sends three Ma-Pets, Sei, Dai, and Ryouku with magic gems to give three girls and transform them into the "Princess Idols" who sings songs to collect Happiness Tones. Later that day, Ringo's family was selling Apple pies, Ringo went walking to give apple pies, then she got ran over a flock of people and it brought her to Wish's concert entrances. Ringo meets Leila Takashiro and Natsuki Sasashara at the concert entrances. Finally, the Ma-Pets founded their respective princesses and gave them the Magic gem which became bracelets and transforms the young girls into older female popstars. When they accidentally debuted the concert, the three girls were known as "Lil' Pri".  Now, they must use their songs to draw and collect Happiness Tones from humans in order to restore Fairyland.

Characters

Lil'Pri

Ringo is a sweet and adventurous girl with a curly and short pink hair with a red headband, red eyes, she wears a white shirt long sleeves with a pink vest with a red bow, a red skirt and dark yellow boots (in summer she wears a white shirt short sleeves with a red bow, a pink and light pink skirt and a cream and red sandals). She dreams of becoming an idol when she's older. Her parents own a bakery that makes "the best apple pie in the world". She has septuplet younger brothers (each named after the days of the week) who are sometimes referred to as "The Seven Dwarfs". Ringo transforms into Snow White and her symbol is an apple. Her Ma-Pet is Sei, whom she tells her family is a parrot. She wears her pink magical diamond in a dark pink heart bracelet on her left wrist that allows her to transform.

Leila is a shy girl with short light yellow hair with a red clips on each side, navy blue eyes, she wears a yellow dress under a light blue sweater with a pink heart with two white wings, black leggings and red Mary jeans (in summer she wear a light blue blouse with a dark blue and white sailor scarf with a yellow button, a yellow shorts and a yellow mary jeans). She tends to be forgetful and clumsy. Her father is Italian and her mother is Japanese. Leila transforms into Cinderella and is represented by a sparkle/diamond. Her Ma-Pet is Dai, a dormouse often confused as a squirrel because of his bushy tail. She wears her light blue magical diamond in a dark blue heart bracelet on her left wrist. Her dad works for a shoe company.

Natsuki is a rich and feisty girl with long violet hair in pigtails with a green bows, dark green eyes, she wears a green and black blouses with bow, a golden yellow belt with a white butterfly, dark purple shorts, long black socks and a yellow and black boots (in summer she wears a lavender blouses with a white frills with an orange butterfly, green overalls and orange shoes). Her family sells fabric for kimono. She is also very good at sports. She transforms into Kaguya-hime and is represented by a crescent moon. Her Ma-Pet is Ryoku, a small green dragon. She wears her purple magical diamond in a dark purple heart bracelet on her left wrist. Natsuki stays with her grandparents despite her parents being out of town.

Ma-Pets

Sei is a light blue parakeet who is Ringo's Ma-Pet. He is sometimes seen as a natural leader. Sei sleeps next to Ringo on her bed at night.

Dai is a gluttonous brown dormouse who is Leila's Ma-Pet. Despite his bushy tail, he is often mistaken as a squirrel, much to his dismay. He has a red lightning bolt strip on his forehead. Because of Leila's klutziness, Dai often has to remind her of the things she forgets. He sleeps in a doll-sized bed in a half completed doll house and owns a hamster wheel.

Ryoku is a turquoise and light blue Chinese dragon who is Natsuki's Ma-Pet. He usually teases Natsuki for not being honest in expressing her feelings. Ryoku is often mistaken as a toy and he sleeps next to Natsuki on a pillow cushion with a small blanket.

Vivi is a grey cat and the Fairyland Keeper's Ma-Pet. She admires Prince Chris, but detests Lil'Pri. She is constantly searching for the "Ultimate Shine card" to permanently turn Wish back into his human form. She has four circular cards that help her find the "Ultimate Shine." In the human world, she inhabits one of the trees in Sakura Park. She can fly by enlarging her ears. She later finds out that Lil'Pri was the Ultimate Shine.

Others

Wish is a popular male idol in the series who sings and endorses products. He is known for his light blue short hair and crimson eyes. When he becomes physically tired, he transforms into a rabbit. It is also revealed that he was the one who retrieved the magic stones that turns the girls into Lilpri. To help him change back and forth in his forms, he was given a watch by the Queen. The watch also contains information on when a tear in Fairyland would appear. The watch also has message recording abilities and hologram creation. In the past, he was a charming prince, always smiling. But ever since he turned into a rabbit, he never smiled until Lilpri came along. After the Ultimate Shine was found, he was restored into his original form for life and he continues to become an idol in the human world. It is a secret between himself and Vivi that if he continues to be in his rabbit form, he will eventually become a normal rabbit for life, unable to talk or sing.

The good-hearted ruler of Fairyland. She is also Chris's mother. She has blue hair and pink eyes. She has a remarkably large crown and a veil. The Queen misses her son very dearly and is good at making rice omelets.

Roo is a nymph of Fairyland. She specializes in flowers and is always seen with the Queen. She acted as Lilpri's guide upon their arrival in Fairyland.

Ringo's father. He does not want to change his apple pie's taste because it was inspired by Ringo's mother in the past.

Ringo's mother. She has red curly hair; She helps Ringo's father with the store and watches her eight children.

Ringo's Septuplet brothers who are named after the days of the week. They are sometimes called "The Seven Dwarfs".

Leila's father. He is Italian and first met Leila's mother at an airport and comments that their names were similar. He owns a shoe company called "Crystal Shoes".

Leila's mother. She is one of the airport's flight attendant and also met Leila's father at an airport.

Voiced by: Kiyohito Yoshikai (Grandfather) and Kyouko Yamaguchi (Grandmother)
Natsuki's grandparents. She lives with them while her parents are absent.

He is the teacher of Lilpri's school. He is married to Moeko. He believes in connection through feelings of the heart.

Media

Anime

Episode List

Music
All songs are in order by episodes.

Sung by Lil'Pri
 Episodes 1-13 and 51

 Episodes 14-26

 Episodes 27-39

 Episodes 40-49

Opening/Ending

Video game
A videogame, based on the anime, was released on 19 August 2010 in Japan, titled "Lilpri DS: Hime-Chan! Apple Pink".

Manga
Lilpri was adapted into two manga series by Mai Jinna.

Although the first series has the same title, it was first published in February 2009, a year before the anime. The second series, titled Puriri! Lilpri, was published in 2011.

References

External links
 Lilpri Official Web Site 
 Lilpri TV.ver Official Web Site 
 TV Tokyo Site 
 Official Nintendo DS Videogame Site 
 

2009 manga
2010 Japanese television series debuts
2011 Japanese television series endings
2011 manga
Japanese children's animated comedy television series
Japanese children's animated fantasy television series
Comedy anime and manga
Fictional princesses
Magical girl anime and manga
Manga series
Shōjo manga
TMS Entertainment
TV Tokyo original programming